Ugly Kid Joe is an American rock band formed in Isla Vista, California, in 1989. Their original lineup consisted of Whitfield Crane on lead vocals, Klaus Eichstadt on lead guitar, Roger Lahr on rhythm guitar, Cordell Crockett on bass, and Mark Davis on drums. To date, their discography consists of five studio albums, two extended plays, two compilation albums, and sixteen singles.

Albums

Studio albums

Compilation albums

Extended plays

Singles

Music videos

References 

Ugly Kid Joe albums
Discographies of American artists
Heavy metal discographies